Mauritanian Americans are Americans of Mauritanian descent or Mauritanians who have American citizenship. According to answers provided to an open-ended question included in the 2000 US census, 993 people said that their ancestry or ethnic origin was Mauritanian. According to a 2012 published report, however, about 4,000 people of Mauritanian origin live in the Cincinnati (Ohio) and  Erlanger (Kentucky) areas and another 1,065 Mauritanians live in Columbus, Ohio.

Demography
Most Mauritanians living in the United States are refugees, fleeing poverty. There are Mauritanian immigrant communities in several parts of United States, such as Brooklyn, New York, and Memphis, Tennessee, but at least one-third of the people of Mauritanian origin resides in Ohio (mostly in Cincinnati and Columbus) and Erlanger, Kentucky. Some of them were historically enslaved Blacks (Haratin) or they were White Moors. Some of the White Moors who settled in the Cincinnati area had clashed with the Mauritanian government, either because they supported a failed candidate for president or because their families spoke out against government policies, including slavery. Some "Afro-Mauritanians", who have a  darker skin but were never enslaved, are also present in the United States. The White Moors and Black Moors speak dialects of Arabic, while the Afro-Mauritanians speak African languages.

Mauritanian Americans have created several community associations in the United States, such as Mauritanian Community and Friendship in Erlanger, Kentucky (composed mostly of White Moors) and the Mauritanian Community Association of Ohio in Cincinnati (composed almost entirely of Afro-Mauritanians). The purpose of the latter organization is to help Mauritanian Americans "in many aspects: human, social and cultural". Its future plans include assisting Mauritanian refugees in Senegal and Mali and persons living in Mauritania.

Notable people
Ahmed Ould Sid'Ahmed
Ahmedou Ould-Abdallah
Nasser Weddady
Mamoudou Athie

References

External links
Mauritanians in America 

+
American